Ronja Steinborn (born 23 December 1990) is a German modern pentathlete.

She participated at the 2018 World Modern Pentathlon Championships, winning a medal.

References

External links

Living people
1990 births
German female modern pentathletes
World Modern Pentathlon Championships medalists
Sportspeople from Berlin
21st-century German women